Chebyshev is a large lunar impact crater that lies in the southern hemisphere on the far side of the Moon. The somewhat smaller crater Langmuir is intruding into the east-southeastern rim of Chebyshev, forming a chain of large craters with Brouwer on Langmuir's eastern rim.

The outer rim of this walled plain is eroded and somewhat irregular, although much of the perimeter can still be discerned. The outer rampart of Langmuir spills into the interior, forming a rough patch in the southeastern floor. Several craters lie along the western rim, most notably Chebyshev U. The rim of this last crater is sharp-edged but somewhat irregular due to some slight outward bulges. The northern rim of Chebyshev has a wide notch extending outward about 30–40 kilometres in a V-shape. There are some other minor craters along the northeast rim, and the southern rim is a disorganized jumble.

The interior floor of Chebyshev is a mixture of relatively level plains and irregular stretches. A short chain of small craters has formed a gouge from the western inner wall reaching almost to the midpoint. There are several streaky clefts in the floor in the northeastern part of the crater. In the south is the bowl-shaped satellite crater Chebyshev N, a nearly symmetrical formation except for a slight outward bulge to the southwest. There is also an irregular crater along the inner wall to the west-southwest.

Satellite craters
By convention these features are identified on lunar maps by placing the letter on the side of the crater midpoint that is closest to Chebyshev.

See also 
 2010 Chebyshev, belt asteroid

References

 
 
 
 
 
 
 
 
 

Impact craters on the Moon